Installation is a Christian liturgical act that formally inducts an incumbent into a new role at a particular place such as a cathedral. The term arises from the act of symbolically leading the incumbent to their stall or throne within the cathedral or other place of worship (the word "cathedral" derives from the cathedra, the bishop's throne).

In the Catholic tradition, installations are carried out for bishops or archbishops who oversee a diocese or archdiocese, not for coadjutor or auxiliary bishops. In the Anglican tradition, the term is additionally commonly used when inaugurating a new dean or canon.

References

Christian worship and liturgy